Atanas is a name. Its most common use is a masculine given name in Bulgarian and Macedonian, derived from Greek Athanasios, "immortal". It can also be a surname.

List
People with the name Atanas include:

Given name
 Atanas Andonov (born 1955), Bulgarian decathlete
 Atanas Angelov, Bulgarian sprint canoer 
 Atanas Apostolov (born 1989), Bulgarian football winger
 Atanas Arshinkov (born 1987), Bulgarian football goalkeeper
 Atanas Atanasov (disambiguation), multiple people, including:
Atanas Atanasov (footballer, born 1985) (born 1985), Bulgarian footballer
Atanas Atanasov (long jumper) (born 1956), Bulgarian retired long jumper
Atanas Atanasov (runner) (born 1945), Bulgarian retired runner
Atanas Atanasov (cyclist) (born 1904), Bulgarian cyclist
Atanas Atanasov (football manager) (born 1963), Bulgarian footballer and football coach and manager
 Atanas Badev (1860–1908), Bulgarian composer and music teacher
 Atanas Bornosuzov (born 1979), Bulgarian football midfielder
 Atanas Chipilov (born 1987), Bulgarian footballer
 Atanas Chochev (born 1957), Bulgarian triple jumper and long jumper
 Atanas Dalchev (1904–1978), Bulgarian poet, critic and translator
 Atanas Drenovichki (born 1990), Bulgarian football defender
 Atanas Dzhambazki (born 1969), Bulgarian football player and manager 
 Atanas Fidanin (born 1986), Bulgarian footballer
 Atanas Gerov (born 1945), Bulgarian footballer
 Atanas Golomeev, Bulgarian basketball player
 Atanas Ivanov (born 1990), Bulgarian football midfielder
 Atanas Keya, Kenyan politician
 Atanas Kirov (born 1946), Bulgarian bantamweight weightlifter
 Atanas Kolev (born 1967), Bulgarian chess Grandmaster
 Atanas Komchev (1959–1994), Bulgarian wrestler
 Atanas Krastev (born 1993), Bulgarian footballer
 Atanas Kurdov (born 1988), Bulgarian football forward
 Atanas Lyaskov (born 1979), Bulgarian football midfielder
 Atanas Mihaylov (1949–2006), Bulgarian football former forward and manager
 Atanas Nikolov (born 1977), Bulgarian footballer
 Atanas Nikolovski (born 1980), Macedonian slalom canoer 
 Atanas Paparizov (born 1951), Bulgarian politician
 Atanas Pashev (born 1963), Bulgarian football winger
 Atanas Semerdzhiev (1924–2015), Bulgarian politician
 Atanas Shopov (born 1951), Bulgarian weightlifter
 Atanas Tarev (born 1958), Bulgarian pole vaulter
 Atanas Uzunov (born 1955), Bulgarian football referee
 Atanas Vargov (born 1984), Bulgarian football midfielder
 Atanas Zehirov (born 1989), Bulgarian football right back

Surname
 Walt Atanas (1923–1991), Canadian ice hockey right winger

See also
 Atanasov
 Atanasoff
 Atanasije

Bulgarian masculine given names